Bow Bridge may refer to:

Bow Bridge, Cumbria, England
Bow Bridge, Plox, England
Bow Bridge, London, England
Bow Bridge, Western Australia, in the Shire of Denmark
Bow Bridge, Central Park, New York, US